Mauro Dal Sie (born 13 October 1967 in San Donà di Piave) is a former Italian rugby union player and a current coach. He played as a prop.

Dal Sie first played at Amatori Rugby San Donà, where he was in the first team from 1985/86 to 1995/96. He then moved to Benetton Treviso, where he played from 1987/88 to 1999/2000. He won 3 titles of the Italian Championship, in 1996/97, 1997/98 and 1998/99, and the Cup of Italy, in 1997/98. He returned to Amatori Rugby San Donà, where he remained the final seasons of his career, finished in 2002/03.

Dal Sie had 7 caps for Italy, from 1993 to 1996, without scoring. He was called for the 1995 Rugby World Cup but never left the bench.

He is the coach of San Donà since 2003/04.

References

External links

1967 births
Living people
Italian rugby union players
Italy international rugby union players
Italian rugby union coaches
Benetton Rugby players
Rugby union props